Semecarpus forstenii is a species of tree in the family Anacardiaceae. It is found in Indonesia, Papua New Guinea, and the Solomon Islands. The tree's sap is poisonous.

Names
S. forstenii is reconstructed as *lapuka in the Proto-Malayo-Polynesian language, the reconstructed ancestor of the Malayo-Polynesian languages.

References

Flora of New Guinea
forstenii